Fuel Bio One, LLC, is commercial producer of Biodiesel at its facility in Elizabeth, NJ. Biodiesel is a renewable, clean burning diesel replacement. It is made from a diverse mix of naturally occurring oils and fats.

References
 

Biofuel in the United States
Energy in New Jersey
Companies based in Union County, New Jersey
Renewable resource companies established in 2006
2006 establishments in New Jersey
American companies established in 2006